Lev Aronovich Barenboim (1906 in Odessa – 1985) was a Soviet pianist and musicologist.

Barenboim taught at the Leningrad Conservatory. He published a volume of Anton Rubinstein letters and discussed with Heinrich Neuhaus on his book The art of piano playing. After his death his collection of scores, music books and recordings was assigned to the Russian National Library.

References 
 National Library of Russia
 Anton Rubinstein - An annotated catalog of piano works and biography
 2000 Volgograd piano music festival
 http://dic.academic.ru/dic.nsf/enc_music/778/%D0%91%D0%B0%D1%80%D0%B5%D0%BD%D0%B1%D0%BE%D0%B9%D0%BC

1906 births
1985 deaths
Musicians from Odesa
People from Odessky Uyezd
Odesa Jews
Soviet classical pianists
Soviet musicologists
Academic staff of Saint Petersburg Conservatory
20th-century musicologists